This article presents lists of the literary events and publications in 1643.

Events
May/June – René Descartes, having had his philosophy condemned by the University of Utrecht, begins his long correspondence with Princess Elizabeth of Bohemia.
June 16 – The Parliament of England issues the Licensing Order of 1643 to control the press – the action against which John Milton protests in his Areopagitica of the following year.
August 1 – The first of Milton's divorce tracts is published, anonymously and unlicensed.
unknown dates
Cardinal Mazarin opens the Bibliothèque Mazarine in Paris to scholars.
The medieval Icelandic manuscript Codex Regius comes to light, in the possession of Bishop Brynjólfur Sveinsson.
Miyamoto Musashi begins dictating The Book of Five Rings (Go Rin No Sho).
Francis Bacon's New Atlantis and Tommaso Campanella's Civitas Solis, The City of the Sun, are published together in a volume titled Mundus Alter et Idem – the first time, though not the last, that the two works will be bound together.

New books

Prose
Sir Thomas Browne – Religio Medici (first "authorized" edition, after two unauthorized in the previous year)
Sir Kenelm Digby – Observations Upon Religio Medici
Philip Hunton – A Treatise of Monarchie
John Milton – Doctrine and Discipline of Divorce
Roger Williams – A Key into the Language of America
Pedro Agerre (Axular) – Gero

Drama
Pierre Corneille
Le Menteur
Polyeucte
Sir William Davenant – The Unfortunate Lovers published
Claude de L'Estoile – La Belle Esclave (The Beautiful Slave)
Francisco de Quevedo
Entremés de las sombras
La mujer de Peribáñez

Poetry
Ramillete gracioso
Antoine Girard de Saint-Amant – Albion

Births
March 26 – Louis Moréri, French encyclopedist and priest (died 1680)
September 18 – Gilbert Burnet, Scottish historian and bishop (died 1715)
November 1 – John Strype, English historian, biographer and cleric (died 1737)
November 16 – Jean Chardin, French travel writer (died 1713)
unknown date – Thomas Rymer, English Historiographer Royal (died 1713)

Deaths
February 9 – Sidney Godolphin, English poet (born 1610)
April 4 – Simon Episcopius, Dutch theologian (born 1583)
April 12 – Nicolaus Hunnius, German theologian (born 1585)
April 20 – Christoph Demantius, German poet and composer (born 1567)
November 29 – William Cartwright, English poet, dramatist and cleric (born 1611)
unknown dates
Abraham Azulai, Moroccan-born Kabbalistic author (born c. 1570)
Thomas Master, English poet, translator and cleric (born 1603)
Pedro de Oña, Chilean poet (born 1570)
probable
Mícheál Ó Cléirigh, Irish chronicler (born c. 1590)
Henry Glapthorne, English dramatist (born 1610)

References

 
Years of the 17th century in literature